The Earls of Lade were a dynasty of Norse jarls from Lade (Old Norse: Hlaðir), who ruled what is now Trøndelag and Hålogaland from the 9th century to the 11th century. 

The seat of the Earls of Lade was at Lade Gaard, now located in the eastern parts of the city of Trondheim. The site is near the seaside of the Trondheimsfjord, which was an important waterway in the Viking Age.   

According to Snorri, King Harald I of Norway was a great commander but lacked a fleet. For that he was assisted by Håkon Grjotgardsson. In gratitude Harald made him the first earl of Lade.

Notable Earls of Lade 
 Hákon Grjótgarðsson (c. 860–870 – c. 900–920), an ally and father-in-law of Harald Fairhair
 Sigurðr Hákonarson (died 962), friend and advisor of Hákon the Good
 Hákon Sigurðarson (c. 937–995), ruler of Norway from about 975 to 995
 Eiríkr Hákonarson (960s – 1020s), governor of the majority of Norway under Svein Forkbeard
 Sveinn Hákonarson (died c. 1016), governor of a part of Norway under Olaf the Swede
 Hákon Eiríksson (died c. 1029–1030), governor of Norway under Canute the Great, last of the Earls of Lade

References

Other sources
Holmsen, Andreas (1976) Norges historie: fra de eldste tider til 1660 (Oslo: Universitetsforlaget)  
Stylegar, Frans-Arne (2013) Håkon Jarl (Oslo: Spartacus forlag AS)  
 Titlestad, Torgrim (2011)  Norge i vikingtid (Stavanger: Saga Bok AS)   
Thuesen, Nils Petter (2011) Norges historie (Oslo: Forlaget Historie og Kultur)

External links
Lade gård

Viking Age people in Norway
Lade